is a Japanese name, which may refer to:

People 
, Japanese master swordsman, painter, and author of The Book of Five Rings
, Japanese science fiction writer
, Japanese former professional footballer
, Japanese retired kickboxer
, Wushu martial artist and actor
, Japanese footballer

Places 
 Musashi Province, an old province of Japan
 Musashi Imperial Graveyard
 Musashi, Ōita, Japan
 Musashi University
 Musashi-Kosugi Station

Science 
 Musashi-1, RNA-binding protein Musashi homolog 1
 Musashi-2, RNA-binding protein Musashi homolog 2

Ships 
 List of ships named Musashi

Entertainment 
 Musashi (novel), a 1935 novel by Eiji Yoshikawa
 Musashi's, a Japanese feline musical group
 Brave Fencer Musashi, a 1998 PlayStation video game
 Musashi: Samurai Legend, a 2005 PlayStation 2 video game

Characters 
 Joe Musashi, the protagonist of the Shinobi video games
 Musashi, the protagonist of the video games Brave Fencer Musashi and Musashi: Samurai Legend
 Musashi, a character in Eyeshield 21
 Musashi (Pokémon) or Jessie, a member of The Team Rocket trio in Pokémon
 Musashi (Shugo Chara!), a character in Shugo Chara!
 Musashi Haruno, the main character in Ultraman Cosmos
 Musashi Tomoe, a character in the mecha series Getter Robo
 Musashi, the protagonist of the video game Sushi Striker: The Way of Sushido
 Musashi, the main character of the manga/anime Orient by Shinobu Ohtaka|Shinobu Ohtaka

See also 
 Musashino
 Kōzuke-Musashi Campaign

Japanese masculine given names